Razzy is a given name. Notable people with the name include:

 Razzy Bailey (1939–2021), American country music artist
 Razzy Hammadi (born 1979), French politician

See also
 Razzy Dazzy Spasm Band (disambiguation)
 Golden Raspberry Awards, or Razzies, award ceremony for the worst films